Ragnar Zolberg (born 2 December 1986) is an Icelandic singer-songwriter and a multi-instrumentalist.

Zolberg is a founding member of Sign, and has released five studio albums with that band. Zolberg joined Pain of Salvation in 2011 as their guitar player and part-time singer and appeared on their 2014 album Falling Home, the 2016 live album "Remedy Lane Re:lived" and 2017 album In the Passing Light of Day. He parted ways with the band in April 2017 due to differences with band leader Daniel Gildenlöw.

Ragnar embarked on a solo career by the age of 11 when he released his first album Upplifun in 1998. He has since then released several solo albums.

Discography
- 1998 : Upplifun!

- 2008 : The circle

- 2011 : the hanged man

- 2014 : The hermit

- 2015 : Feelings

- 2017 : The circle (darkerside) 

- 2018 : ROG

- 2019 : Sonr ravns

- 2020 : ROG II

- 2020: 220 Ep

- 2020: Jòla ep 

- 2021: Headphones single

- 2022: Forest Lovesongs

References

1986 births
Living people
Pain of Salvation members